Kings Langley railway station is almost under the M25 motorway near Junction 20. It serves the village of Kings Langley, and the nearby villages of Abbots Langley and Hunton Bridge. The station and all services calling at the station are operated by London Northwestern Railway.

The station was opened in 1839.

Services
All services at Kings Langley are operated by London Northwestern Railway.

The typical off-peak service in trains per hour is:
 2 tph to London Euston
 2 tph to 

During the peak hours, a number of additional services between London Euston,  and  call at the station.

History

The line was fully opened between Euston and Birmingham Curzon Street in September 1838. Kings Langley had no station of its own, the nearest station being at Boxmoor or Watford. 
Local industrialist John Dickinson used his influence to convince the L&BR to open a station at Kings Langley, and in 1839 Kings Langley railway station opened.

From 1909 the station was known as Kings Langley & Abbots Langley, becoming Kings Langley on 6 May 1974.

Accidents and incidents

On 5 January 1847, a collision occurred between two trains of the LNWR due to fog. Two people died.
On 1 October 1854, the late-running 17:40 Rugby to London coal train operated by LNWR arrived at King's Langley to drop off a wagon for the station. As the train departed, a coupling failed, separating thirteen wagons from the train. Due to repairs on the coupling, none of the guards were guarding the line for oncoming trains. Shortly thereafter, the 21:15 goods train also from Rugby to London collided with the coal train's stranded portion just north of the station. The fireman of the goods train tried to jump off of his train before the collision, but his leg was crushed and it was amputated.
On 13 March 1935, an express meat train from Liverpool to London was brought to a halt at Kings Langley due to a defective vacuum brake. Due to a signalman's error a milk train ran into its rear. Wreckage spread across all four lines, with the result that a few minutes later the Camden to Holyhead freight collided with the debris, followed a few seconds later by the Toton to Willesden coal train. Contemporaneous newsreel footage shows the aftermath of the four-fold accident. All four lines were blocked for some time, William Buckley, the milk train's driver was killed and the guard of the meat train and fireman of the goods train were injured. The signalman of King's Langley Block had accepted the meat train from the previous block at Nash Mills at 23:03, but did not receive the train and had a phone call with the Nash Mills signalman at 23:05 to ask about the train, in which he believed that the train Nash Mills wanted him to take was a passenger train that passed earlier, so he cleared his signals for the milk train, not realizing that the meat train had entered his section and broken down due to a vacuum brake failure and was only just proceeding when the milk train collided.
On 21 April 1963, the 12:20 Holyhead to Euston express running on the up fast line collided with a rail-mounted crane whose boom was projected over the up fast line north of the station. The express struck the crane at a glancing blow, derailing the British Rail Class 40 hauling the train and four carriages. The accident was caused by the failure of the workman supervising the crane work, as he had arranged to guard the crane's work despite not being able to communicate with the signalmen who would stop the trains. A restaurant staff member aboard the express was slightly injured.

References

Notes

External links

Railway stations in Three Rivers District
DfT Category E stations
Former London and Birmingham Railway stations
Railway stations in Great Britain opened in 1839
Railway stations served by West Midlands Trains
Stations on the West Coast Main Line